Aphrophora princeps, the cone spittlebug, is a species of spittlebug in the family Aphrophoridae. It is found in North America.

References

Articles created by Qbugbot
Insects described in 1928
Aphrophoridae